Cleverson Oliveira da Silva Teixeira (born 5 September 1973) is a retired Brazilian athlete who specialised in the 400 metres hurdles. He won multiple medals at the continental level and jointly holds the South American Championships record in the 4 × 400 metres relay. He represented his country at the 1996 Summer Olympics failing to qualify for the semifinals.

His personal best is 49.10 seconds set in 1999.

Competition record

References

1973 births
Living people
Brazilian male hurdlers
Athletes (track and field) at the 1996 Summer Olympics
Athletes (track and field) at the 1999 Pan American Games
Olympic athletes of Brazil
World Athletics Championships athletes for Brazil
Pan American Games athletes for Brazil
Pan American Games medalists in athletics (track and field)
Pan American Games silver medalists for Brazil
Medalists at the 1999 Pan American Games
21st-century Brazilian people
20th-century Brazilian people